1987 - World Championship (France - (Glermon - Fegan)) - (gold medal) 1st place;

Mahaddin Allahverdiyev  (commonly known as "Misha" was born 8 May 1962, in Sumqayit, Azerbaijan SSR) is a former Greco-Roman wrestler for the Soviet Union of Azerbaijani descent.

Personal Life

He was brought up by the Central Army Sports Club (Moscow). He is an honored master of sports of the USSR. He is a reserve Soviet officer. His coach (1980-1990) was the head coach of the USSR, the two-time world champion, the honored master of sports of the USSR, the honored coach of the USSR Mr. Sapunov Gennady Andpevich. He graduated from the Leningrad Military Institute in 1982-1984 (was awarded the rank of army officer by order of the USSR Minister of Defense). In 1981-1986 he graduated from the coaching faculty at the Baku Sports Academy. In March 1986, at the closing of the XXVII Congress of the Soviet Communist Party in Moscow, he became the first flag bearer of Azerbaijan during the USSR. In November 1987, at the Greco-Roman Wrestling World Cup in Albany, USA, he was awarded the title of the most technical wrestler in the world and the biggest prize of the competition. He graduated from the law faculty of Baku State University in 1988–1993. In 1988, at the age of 26, he left the sport voluntarily due to an injury(ruptured groin) that he received on the eve of the Summer Olympics. In 1992-1993 he served as Minister of Sports of the Republic of Azerbaijan, in 1992-1997 as President of the National Olympic Committee of the Republic of Azerbaijan. He trained in "CSKA Moscow" sports societies in Moscow, Russia. Looking back from 1992 to 1997, he was the first ever President of the National Olympic Committee of Azerbaijan. He was awarded the title of European champion, 6 times World Cup (three individual, three team), 3 times USSR Cup winner, USSR champion, 4th Olympic medalist and honored coach of the Republic of Azerbaijan. He is married and has two children.

Accomplishments

· 1980 - USSR Cup (Bishkek - Furunze) - 1st place (personal account);

· 1981 - USSR Youth Championship (18–20 years old) (Russia - Leningrad) - 1st place;

· 1981 - World Youth Championship (18–20 years old) (Canada - Vancouver) - 2nd place;

· 1981 - USSR Cup (Russia - Kirov) - 1st place (personal account);

· 1982 - USSR Cup (Ukraine - Donetsk) - 1st place (personal account);

· 1982 - USSR Youth Championship (18–20 years old) (Russia - Irkutsk) - 1st place;

· 1982 - European Youth Championship (18–20 years old) (Germany - Leinchik) - 3rd place;

· 1983 - World Cup (Greece - Thessaloniki) - 2 gold medals (individual and team);

· 1983 - Spartakiad of the peoples of the USSR (Russia - Moscow) - bronze medal:

· 1984 - USSR Military Championship (Belarus - Minsk) - 1st place;

· 1984 - USSR Championship (Belarus - Minsk) - 2nd place;

· 1984 - European Championship (Sweden - Jönköping) - 1st place with a record score (60: 0);

· 1984 - World Cup (Finland - Suonenyoki) - 2 gold medals (individual and team);

· 1985 - USSR Championship (Russia - Krasnoyarsk) - 1st place;

· 1985 - World Championship (Norway - Kolbotn) - 1st place;

· 1986 - World Championship (Budapest, Hungary) - (with a great advantage) 1st place;

· 1987 - World Championship (France - (Glermon - Fegan)) - (gold medal) 1st place;

· 1987 - World Cup (USA - Albany) - 2 gold medals (individual and team);

· 1988 - XXIV Summer Olympic Games - 4th place (due to a ruptured groin)

. 2006 - World Championship (40–45 years old) (Latvia-Riga) - 1st place world champion.

References

External links
 

1962 births
Living people
Soviet male sport wrestlers
Olympic wrestlers of the Soviet Union
Wrestlers at the 1988 Summer Olympics
Azerbaijani male sport wrestlers
People from Sumgait
World Wrestling Championships medalists
Honoured Masters of Sport of the USSR
European Wrestling Champions
Dynamo sports society athletes